The Apella was the popular deliberative assembly of Sparta.

Apella may also refer to:

 Apellai, a Doric family-festival

See also
 Apellas, sculptor of ancient Greece
 Sapajus apella (tufted capuchin), a primate
 Apellaia, the offerings made at the initiation of a young man of the northwest Greeks